Barandaq is a village in Khvoresh Rostam-e Jonubi Rural District of Khvoresh Rostam District, Khalkhal County, Ardabil province. At the 2006 census, its population was 1,488 in 381 households. The following census in 2011 counted 1,270 people in 396 households. The latest census in 2016 showed a population of 1,820 people in 580 households; it was the largest village in its rural district.

References 

Khalkhal County

Towns and villages in Khalkhal County

Populated places in Ardabil Province

Populated places in Khalkhal County